Belmont Tunnel may refer to:
Belmont Tunnel / Toluca Substation and Yard, a railway tunnel in Los Angeles
Belmont Tunnel (Nebraska), the only railway tunnel in Nebraska